This is a list of Georgia State Panthers football players in the NFL Draft.

Key

Selections

References

Georgia State

Georgia State Panthers NFL Draft